Cazaly is a surname. Notable people with the surname include:

Ernest Cazaly (1886–1940), Australian rules footballer
Roy Cazaly (1893–1963), Australian rules footballer

See also 
 Cazaly Stadium
"Up There Cazaly", 1979 song by Mike Brady, written to promote Channel Seven's coverage of the Victorian Football League